Boom Sport Two was a Romanian sports channel which was available only via Direct To Home platform Boom TV. The channel had the broadcast rights for:

La Liga
Serie A
Copa del Rey
NBA
NHL

References

External links
Boom Sport Two
Boom Sport Two at LyngSat Address

Boom TV (Romania)
Sports television networks
Television channels and stations established in 2006
Defunct television channels in Romania
2010 disestablishments in Romania
Television channels and stations disestablished in 2010